Carl Davies (born 30 July 1964) is a British biathlete. He competed in the 20 km individual event at the 1988 Winter Olympics.

References

1964 births
Living people
British male biathletes
Olympic biathletes of Great Britain
Biathletes at the 1988 Winter Olympics
Sportspeople from Leeds